Soest railway station may refer to 
Soest (Germany) station
Soest (Netherlands) railway station